The Soqotri people, sometimes referred to as Socotran, are a Arabian ethnic group native to the Gulf of Aden island of Socotra. They speak the Soqotri language, a South Arabian language in the Afroasiatic family.

General 

The Soqotri primarily inhabit the Socotra Archipelago, on Socotra island and the Abd al Kuri, Darsah and Samhah districts of the Amanat Al Asimah governorate, Yemen.

According to Ethnologue, there is an estimate of 71,400 Soqotri. As of the last 1990 Socotra census, they numbered around 57,000 individuals.

Most Soqotri are Sunni Muslim. Historically, Soqotri were Nestorian Christians, ever since Christianization of the island up until the 15th century, when the island was occupied by the Mehri Sultanate in 1480. This led to slow Islamisation of the Soqotri.

Language 

The Soqotri speak the Soqotri language (also known as Saqatri, Socotri, Sokotri and Suqutri). It belongs to the Modern South Arabian languages which are closer to the Ethiopian Semitic languages than to Arabic (Central Semitic languages). Despite historical contacts with the Arabic language, there is no mutual understanding between the native speakers of the Modern South Arabian languages and the native speaker of Arabic. Moreover, there is no mutual understanding between the speakers of the Modern South Arabian languages themselves, and the Soqotri language is only spoken on the island of Socotra.

Soqotri has several dialects, which consist of ’Abd Al-Kuri, Central Soqotri, Northern Soqotri, Southern Soqotri and Western Soqotri. North Soqotri comprises North Central and Northwest Central (highland) Soqotri.

The language is written using the Naskh variant of the Arabic script. Soqotri is also transcribed with the Latin script.

Genetics 
Most Soqotri belong to the paternal haplogroup J, bearing the basal J*(xJ1,J2) clade at its highest frequencies (71.4%). The remaining individuals mainly carry the J1 subclade (14.3%). YFull and FTDNA have however failed to find J* people anywhere in the world although there are 2 J2-Y130506 persons and 1 J1 person from Soqotra.

Maternally, the Soqotri primarily belong to the haplogroups N (24.3% N*; 6.2% N1a) and R0 (17.8% R0a1b; 13.8% R0a; 6.2% R0a1). The basal N* clade occurs at its highest frequencies among them. The next most common mtDNA lineages borne by Soqotri individuals are the haplogroups J (9.2% J*; 3.1 J1b), T (7.7% T2; 1.2% T*), L3 (4.3% L3*), H (3.1%), and R (1.2 R*).

See also 
 Mahra Sultanate

Notes

References 
 Ethnologue - Soqotri language

Tribes of Arabia
Yemeni tribes
Afroasiatic peoples
Ethnic groups in Yemen
Socotra archipelago
Ethnic groups in the Middle East